A female husband is a person born as a woman, living as a man, who marries a woman. The term was known historically from the 17th Century and was popularised by Henry Fielding who titled his 1746 fictionalised account of the trial of Mary Hamilton The Female Husband.

Prosecutions involving women living as men and marrying other women were reported in the seventeenth century and eighteenth centuries. In many of these historic instances, the female husband was presented as having deceived the bride and was accused of defrauding her.

Notable cases of female husbands

James Howard - 1680 
On 12 September 1680, in London, James Howard married Arabella Hunt. Hunt later filed for divorce stating that Howard was of double gender or hermaphrodite, and still married to a man as a woman. After being examined by midwives, Howard was declared a woman "in all her parts". Howard's social status (as gentry) and willingness to abide with the court's order protected them from penalty.

Mary Jewit - 1682 
The first documented case specifically mentioning the term "female husband" was described in an English broadside The Male and Female Husband of 1682. This recounted the case of an intersex person named Mary Jewit who was abandoned, and who was raised as a girl by a midwife in St Albans. Jewit then worked with the nurse for years under a female identity, until getting a woman pregnant. A judge decided that this act was proof of manhood, and that Jewit had to live as a man and marry the woman. Jewit agreed to do so.

Unnamed - 1694 
In 1694, Anthony à Wood wrote in a letter:

Sarah/John Ketson - 1720 
In 1720, Sarah Ketson took on the name John and was prosecuted for an alleged attempt to defraud a woman named Ann Hutchinson into marriage. Ketson was eventually convicted.

Mary/Charles Hamilton - 1746 
Mary Hamilton was a cross-dressing woman who, living as a man under the name of Charles Hamilton, married Mary Price. When Mary Price became suspicious of Hamilton's manhood, Hamilton was prosecuted for vagrancy, and was sentenced in 1746 to a whipping and to six months imprisonment.

. Henry Fielding published a popular fictionalised account of the case under the title The Female Husband.

Sarah Paul/Samuel Bundy - 1759 
In 1759, Sarah Paul, going by the name Samuel Bundy, was convicted and sent to Southwark Bridewell for tricking Mary Parlour into marrying her and defrauding her of money and apparel. Although it was Parlour who brought the case, that appears to have been under community pressure. Parlour knew of Paul's sex and originally chose to continue their relationship. Neighbours who suspected that they had not consummated the marriage discovered that Paul was performing as a man. Parlour failed to appear at trial, resulting in the magistrate discharging Paul, but not before he ordered her masculine clothing to be burned.

James Allen - 1829 

In 1829 it was reported that another female husband, James Allen, had successfully lived as a man without facing prosecution for 21 years. Allen had married Abigail (née Naylor) in 1807 at St Giles' Church, Camberwell. It was only under autopsy at St Thomas' Hospital, London, that his sex was discovered to be female. Abigail said she "was not suspicious of her husband's sex because Allen was uncannily strong". She felt that she was threatened by her neighbours and the only way they would leave her alone would be to swear she had no idea. A sensational pamphlet purported to provide the public with "An Authentic Narrative of the Extraordinary Career of James Allen, the Female Husband [...]".

Women's rights reception 
The cases of female husbands in general went unnoticed by women's rights activists. The life experience of these female husbands was not seen as something bringing progress and when they were described, it was often in a critical way. Hannah More, although she vowed not to marry and dedicate herself to women's education, believed in the superiority of women shown by their capacity to sacrifice and obey. Therefore she did not support women taking on men's roles and to become “male imitators".

Priscilla Wakefield, a feminist quaker and writer living in London ridiculed the idea of a feminine man or a masculine woman, believing in the natural separation of men and women. For her a woman becoming a man would be a terrible "citizen, husband and father" and be burdened by "exquisite feeling, delicacy, gentleness and forbearance of female excellence".

Sources

References

External links
 'Female Husbands' In The 19th Century (NPR, January 29, 2015)
 Female husbands (Jen Manion, Aeon, May 7, 2020)

Female-to-male cross-dressers
English LGBT people
18th-century LGBT people
17th-century LGBT people
19th-century LGBT people
Husbands